The Nizhny Tagil constituency (No.171) is a Russian legislative constituency in Sverdlovsk Oblast. The constituency covers central Sverdlovsk Oblast and anchors in the industrial city of Nizhny Tagil.

Members elected

Election results

1993

|-
! colspan=2 style="background-color:#E9E9E9;text-align:left;vertical-align:top;" |Candidate
! style="background-color:#E9E9E9;text-align:left;vertical-align:top;" |Party
! style="background-color:#E9E9E9;text-align:right;" |Votes
! style="background-color:#E9E9E9;text-align:right;" |%
|-
|style="background-color:"|
|align=left|Artur Veyer
|align=left|Independent
|
|22.50%
|-
|style="background-color:#DBB726"|
|align=left|Anatoly Kotkov
|align=left|Democratic Party
| -
|20.91%
|-
| colspan="5" style="background-color:#E9E9E9;"|
|- style="font-weight:bold"
| colspan="3" style="text-align:left;" | Total
| 
| 100%
|-
| colspan="5" style="background-color:#E9E9E9;"|
|- style="font-weight:bold"
| colspan="4" |Source:
|
|}

1995

|-
! colspan=2 style="background-color:#E9E9E9;text-align:left;vertical-align:top;" |Candidate
! style="background-color:#E9E9E9;text-align:left;vertical-align:top;" |Party
! style="background-color:#E9E9E9;text-align:right;" |Votes
! style="background-color:#E9E9E9;text-align:right;" |%
|-
|style="background-color:#00A200"|
|align=left|Anatoly Kotkov
|align=left|Transformation of the Fatherland
|
|17.01%
|-
|style="background-color:#DA2021"|
|align=left|Artur Veyer (incumbent)
|align=left|Ivan Rybkin Bloc
|
|16.14%
|-
|style="background-color:"|
|align=left|Irina Kungurtseva
|align=left|Communist Party
|
|11.33%
|-
|style="background-color:"|
|align=left|Fyodor Dudkin
|align=left|Independent
|
|10.91%
|-
|style="background-color:"|
|align=left|Rudolf Chernikov
|align=left|Independent
|
|10.24%
|-
|style="background-color:"|
|align=left|Leonid Merzlyakov
|align=left|Liberal Democratic Party
|
|9.73%
|-
|style="background-color:#1C1A0D"|
|align=left|Igor Rukachev
|align=left|Forward, Russia!
|
|6.24%
|-
|style="background-color:#000000"|
|colspan=2 |against all
|
|15.79%
|-
| colspan="5" style="background-color:#E9E9E9;"|
|- style="font-weight:bold"
| colspan="3" style="text-align:left;" | Total
| 
| 100%
|-
| colspan="5" style="background-color:#E9E9E9;"|
|- style="font-weight:bold"
| colspan="4" |Source:
|
|}

1999

|-
! colspan=2 style="background-color:#E9E9E9;text-align:left;vertical-align:top;" |Candidate
! style="background-color:#E9E9E9;text-align:left;vertical-align:top;" |Party
! style="background-color:#E9E9E9;text-align:right;" |Votes
! style="background-color:#E9E9E9;text-align:right;" |%
|-
|style="background-color:"|
|align=left|Valery Yazev
|align=left|Our Home – Russia
|
|46.41%
|-
|style="background-color:"|
|align=left|Anatoly Kotkov (incumbent)
|align=left|Independent
|
|8.87%
|-
|style="background-color:#C62B55"|
|align=left|Sergey Potapov
|align=left|Peace, Labour, May
|
|7.94%
|-
|style="background-color:"|
|align=left|Sergey Belousov
|align=left|Independent
|
|7.24%
|-
|style="background-color:"|
|align=left|Nina Titova
|align=left|Liberal Democratic Party
|
|7.19%
|-
|style="background-color:"|
|align=left|Artur Veyer
|align=left|Independent
|
|4.04%
|-
|style="background-color:"|
|align=left|Gennady Kazakov
|align=left|Independent
|
|2.35%
|-
|style="background-color:#000000"|
|colspan=2 |against all
|
|13.81%
|-
| colspan="5" style="background-color:#E9E9E9;"|
|- style="font-weight:bold"
| colspan="3" style="text-align:left;" | Total
| 
| 100%
|-
| colspan="5" style="background-color:#E9E9E9;"|
|- style="font-weight:bold"
| colspan="4" |Source:
|
|}

2003

|-
! colspan=2 style="background-color:#E9E9E9;text-align:left;vertical-align:top;" |Candidate
! style="background-color:#E9E9E9;text-align:left;vertical-align:top;" |Party
! style="background-color:#E9E9E9;text-align:right;" |Votes
! style="background-color:#E9E9E9;text-align:right;" |%
|-
|style="background-color:"|
|align=left|Valery Yazev (incumbent)
|align=left|United Russia
|
|56.60%
|-
|style="background-color:#1042A5"|
|align=left|Aleksey Bagaryakov
|align=left|Union of Right Forces
|
|18.31%
|-
|style="background-color:"|
|align=left|Yevgeny Goltsev
|align=left|Liberal Democratic Party
|
|4.56%
|-
|style="background-color:"|
|align=left|Sergey Smolyakov
|align=left|Independent
|
|2.62%
|-
|style="background-color:#164C8C"|
|align=left|Aleksandr Tarasov
|align=left|United Russian Party Rus'
|
|0.89%
|-
|style="background-color:#000000"|
|colspan=2 |against all
|
|15.08%
|-
| colspan="5" style="background-color:#E9E9E9;"|
|- style="font-weight:bold"
| colspan="3" style="text-align:left;" | Total
| 
| 100%
|-
| colspan="5" style="background-color:#E9E9E9;"|
|- style="font-weight:bold"
| colspan="4" |Source:
|
|}

2016

|-
! colspan=2 style="background-color:#E9E9E9;text-align:left;vertical-align:top;" |Candidate
! style="background-color:#E9E9E9;text-align:leftt;vertical-align:top;" |Party
! style="background-color:#E9E9E9;text-align:right;" |Votes
! style="background-color:#E9E9E9;text-align:right;" |%
|-
| style="background-color: " |
|align=left|Aleksey Balyberdin
|align=left|United Russia
|
|42.05%
|-
| style="background-color: " |
|align=left|Aleksandr Burkov
|align=left|A Just Russia
|
|22.60%
|-
|style="background-color:"|
|align=left|Vladislav Potanin
|align=left|Communist Party
|
|10.54%
|-
|style="background-color:"|
|align=left|Ildar Rainbakov
|align=left|Liberal Democratic Party
|
|8.66%
|-
|style="background-color: " |
|align=left|Dmitry Abramov
|align=left|Communists of Russia
|
|4.05%
|-
|style="background-color:"|
|align=left|Sergey Lyuft
|align=left|Party of Growth
|
|2.06%
|-
|style="background-color:"|
|align=left|Mikhail Brovin
|align=left|People's Freedom Party
|
|1.56%
|-
|style="background-color: " |
|align=left|Yevgeny Vasilyuk
|align=left|The Greens
|
|1.33%
|-
|style="background-color:"|
|align=left|Salaudin Mamakov
|align=left|Rodina
|
|0.86%
|-
|style="background-color:"|
|align=left|Dmitry Panachev
|align=left|Patriots of Russia
|
|0.84%
|-
| colspan="5" style="background-color:#E9E9E9;"|
|- style="font-weight:bold"
| colspan="3" style="text-align:left;" | Total
| 
| 100%
|-
| colspan="5" style="background-color:#E9E9E9;"|
|- style="font-weight:bold"
| colspan="4" |Source:
|
|}

2021

|-
! colspan=2 style="background-color:#E9E9E9;text-align:left;vertical-align:top;" |Candidate
! style="background-color:#E9E9E9;text-align:left;vertical-align:top;" |Party
! style="background-color:#E9E9E9;text-align:right;" |Votes
! style="background-color:#E9E9E9;text-align:right;" |%
|-
|style="background-color: " |
|align=left|Konstantin Zakharov
|align=left|United Russia
|
|31.75%
|-
|style="background-color:"|
|align=left|Mikhail Boyarkin
|align=left|Communist Party
|
|22.69%
|-
|style="background-color:"|
|align=left|Sergey Belousov
|align=left|A Just Russia — For Truth
|
|16.53%
|-
|style="background-color:"|
|align=left|Maria Barantseva
|align=left|New People
|
|8.65%
|-
|style="background-color:"|
|align=left|Anton Gusev
|align=left|Liberal Democratic Party
|
|7.10%
|-
|style="background-color:"|
|align=left|Ivan Morozov
|align=left|Rodina
|
|2.31%
|-
|style="background-color: " |
|align=left|Pavel Khoroshilov
|align=left|Yabloko
|
|2.10%
|-
|style="background-color: "|
|align=left|Anton Myatovich
|align=left|Russian Party of Freedom and Justice
|
|1.79%
|-
| colspan="5" style="background-color:#E9E9E9;"|
|- style="font-weight:bold"
| colspan="3" style="text-align:left;" | Total
| 
| 100%
|-
| colspan="5" style="background-color:#E9E9E9;"|
|- style="font-weight:bold"
| colspan="4" |Source:
|
|}

Notes

References

Russian legislative constituencies
Politics of Sverdlovsk Oblast